Crossover junction endonuclease EME1 is an enzyme that in humans is encoded by the EME1 gene. It forms a complex with MUS81 which resolves Holliday junctions.  In mammalian cells the EME1/MUS81 protein complex is redundant for DNA damage repair with GEN1 endonuclease.  In mice, EME1/MUS81 and GEN1 redundantly contribute to Holliday junction processing.  When homozygous mutations of Gen1 and Eme1 were combined in mice the result was synthetic lethality at an early embryonic stage.  Homozygosity for Gen1 mutations did not cause a DNA repair deficiency in mice.   But when mice were both homozygous mutant for Gen1 and also heterozyous for an Emc1 mutation, they showed increased sensitivity to DNA damaging agents.  This finding, indicated a redundant role of GEN1 and EME1 in DNA repair.  Gen1 and Emc1 were also shown to have redundant roles in meiotic recombination.

References

Further reading